Edgar Bowring may refer to:

 Edgar Alfred Bowring (1826–1911), British author and translator
 Sir Edgar Rennie Bowring (1858–1943), Newfoundland businessman and politician